Bagot was a federal electoral district in Quebec, Canada, that was represented in the House of Commons of Canada from 1867 to 1935.

It was created by the British North America Act, 1867, and was amalgamated into the St. Hyacinthe—Bagot electoral district in 1933.

Bagot initially consisted of part of the Township of Upton, the township of Acton and the parishes of Saint Hugues, Saint Simon, Sainte Rosalie, Saint Dominique, St. Helene, St. Liboire and Saint Pie.

In 1892, it was redefined to consist of the town of Acton, the village of Upton, and the parishes of St. André d'Acton, St. Ephrem d'Upton, Ste. Hélène, St. Hugues, Ste. Rosalie, St. Simon, St. Théodore d'Acton, St. Marcel and St. Dominique, and those parts of the parishes of St. Nazaire and Ste. Christine that were included in the township of Acton.

In 1903, it was redefined to consist of the town of Acton, the village of Upton, and the parishes of St. André d'Acton, St. Ephrem d'Upton, Ste. Hèlène, St. Hugues, St. Liboire, St. Pie, Ste. Rosalie, St. Simon, St. Théodore d'Acton, St. Dominique, St. Nazaire and Ste. Christine.

In 1924, it was redefined to consist of the County of Bagot. The electoral district was abolished in 1933, and incorporated into  St. Hyacinthe—Bagot electoral district.

Members of Parliament

This riding has elected the following Members of Parliament:

Election results

|-
  
|Conservative
|Joseph-Alfred Mousseau
|align="right"| acclaimed   

 
  
|Conservative
|Flavien Dupont
|align="right"|1,408 
 
|Unknown
|O. Desmarais
|align="right"|1,107

  
|Liberal
|Joseph Edmond Marcile
|align="right"| 1,431   
  
|Conservative
|L.T. Brodeur
|align="right"| 1,384   

  
|Liberal
|Georges Dorèze Morin
|align="right"|3,724 
  
|Conservative
|Guillaume-André Fauteux
|align="right"|3,225    

|-
  
|Liberal
|Cyrille Dumaine
|align="right"| acclaimed

See also 

 List of Canadian federal electoral districts
 Past Canadian electoral districts

External links 

 Riding history from the Library of Parliament
 Bagot County (in French) :fr:Comté de Bagot

Former federal electoral districts of Quebec